IGW (Industrial Gears Watteeuw) is an international gear and gearbox manufacturer. 
The company has its headquarters, IG Watteeuw International nv, in Oostkamp (Belgium). Additionally, it has locations in Brno (Czech Republic), Iași (Romania), Suzhou (China) and Zanesville, Ohio (USA). Globally, IGW employs over 1,000 people.

Activities 
IGW focuses on three main markets: 
 Transport: design and manufacture and servicing of gears, gearboxes and couplings for trains, metros, trams, cable cars and marine. 
 Industry: transmission for a wide range of industries, such as the textile and printing industry, semiconductors, the medical and chemical sector. 
 Energy: oil and gas rigs, power plants, wind turbines and other applications.

History

Foundation 

IGW was founded in 1949 by Alfons Watteeuw, who was only 19 years old at the time. His father Henri Watteeuw was the driving force behind the creation of the company. He was the first certified technical instructor in West-Flanders. As a teacher, guest lecturer at the engineering department of the KU Leuven and technical director of the high school VTI Bruges, he possessed the knowledge and the contacts to set up a successful industrial firm.

The day after Alfons’ graduation, they registered his one-man business “Watteeuw Alfons” at the Commercial Court.

Address of establishment: the barn in their yard; Rapaertstraat 31, Assebroek (Bruges).

Around that time German manufacturing plants were being dismantled, as a penalty for the country’s role in the Second World War. Father and son visited a few depots and eventually purchased a Lorenz gear shaping machine with a diameter capacity of one meter, from the BMW factory in München. That machine would be the first of many…

Continuous growth 
Alfons Watteeuw landed his first large-scale order from a renowned firm in 1964. The Belgian company Arpic Engineering (that was later acquired by Atlas Copco), contacted Watteeuw with a substantial order that had to be delivered on a very short notice.

Furthermore, Alfons always kept his eyes open for opportunities abroad. In 1976 Watteeuw got its first purchase from Atlas Copco in the United States. That signified an international breakthrough. Other international partnerships followed quickly, for example with CNH Industrial, the American producer of New Holland agricultural devices. 

After specializing in agricultural machines, the first investments in the aerospace industry followed. In the early eighties, Watteeuw became the supplier of the slat rack wing mechanism for Airbus.

Father Henri Watteeuw died in 1986. In 1987 the company, by that time named “MC Watteeuw” (Mechanische Constructie Watteeuw / Mechanical Construction Watteeuw), moved to the Kampveldstraat 51 in Oostkamp, where the main offices and factory are still established.

Soon after the move Watteeuw started to invest massively in heat treatment. Because of that the entire gear production became vertically integrated in the company. This helped Watteeuw to distinguish itself from smaller competitors.

Acquisition by BMT 
To finance further growth, and seeing that his children weren’t planning to take over the company, Alfons Watteeuw started looking for an industrial partner in the early nineties. In 1992 Belgium’s longest listed holding BMT took over 60% of the shares in Watteeuw International. Over the years BMT’s participation grew to 100%. The group's investments played a significant role in the further expansion of Watteeuw. BMT (and with it Watteeuw) stayed listed until 2004.

Globalization 
In the early nineties, Watteeuw started an international expansion. In 1997 the company opened its first foreign plant in the Czech Republic, following the so-called greenfield approach by constructing a new factory in Brno. Eventually Watteeuw moved the entire production line of New Holland agricultural gears to that site.

In 1998 it was Romania’s turn. Watteeuw acquired the maintenance department of Terom, the country’s biggest synthetic fiber company at the time. Watteeuw locally produced gears for their machines and provided servicing jobs. When Terom shut down a few years later, Watteeuw bought a part of the remaining factory to offer its services to other customers in the region.

Meanwhile, the firm kept expanding its share in the aerospace industry. In 2000 BMT took over the American company Caratron Industries, manufacturer of precision gears, axles and gearboxes for aeronautic and space devices. Caraton and Eurair, Watteeuw’s subsidiary that delivered to Airbus, were afterwards turned into a new division: BMT Aerospace.

Other areas in which Watteeuw participates since the 2000s are the medical sector,  marine industry and the energy sector, with among others the production of gears for wind turbines.

During that same period Watteeuw started expanding its logistical network. To ameliorate its customer services, the company established local plants and warehouses in the East. Since 2001 Watteeuw has activities in China, initially through a joint-venture with Picanol in the regional branch of AmTech. Watteeuw took over Picanol’s shares in 2006. Up ‘till today the focus of the Chinese plant lays on railway applications for the Asian market. Watteeuw has been a player in the railway industry since the nineties.  
 
In 2013 Watteeuw landed in the United States. Due to the internationalization, a more global approach was needed so the name of the company changed from IG Watteeuw to IGW. 

Alfons Watteeuw died April 1, 2014. Although he hadn’t been president for a while, Alfons kept closely involved in his company until his death.

Corporate governance 
IGW is nowadays 100% owned by the BMT group. BMT has activities in the glass industry, with subsidiaries OMCO, Kite and CNUD-EFCO and the gear manufacturing industry with IGW and BTM Aerospace.

References

Companies based in West Flanders